The 1991–92 Shell Tri-Series was a Women's One Day International (WODI) cricket tournament that was held in New Zealand in January 1992. It was a tri-nation series between Australia, England and New Zealand. It was part of England's tour of Australia and New Zealand.

Australia progressed to the final after winning the group with three wins from four matches, joined by England, who finished second. The final ended in a no result due to rain, with Australia therefore winning the tournament as the group winners.

Squads

Points table

Source: ESPN Cricinfo

Fixtures

1st ODI

2nd ODI

3rd ODI

4th ODI

5th ODI

6th ODI

Final

See also
 English women's cricket team in Australia and New Zealand in 1991–92

References

External links
 Shell Tri-Series 1991/92 from Cricinfo

Women's international cricket tours of New Zealand
England women's cricket team tours
Australia women's national cricket team tours